Francis James Delaney (March 1, 1921 – April 2, 2012) was an American athlete who competed mainly in the shot put.

He competed for the United States in the 1948 Summer Olympics held in London, Great Britain in the shot put where he won the silver medal.

References

External links
 
 

American male shot putters
Olympic silver medalists for the United States in track and field
Athletes (track and field) at the 1948 Summer Olympics
1921 births
2012 deaths
Notre Dame Fighting Irish men's track and field athletes
Medalists at the 1948 Summer Olympics